Scissett is a village in West Yorkshire, England. According to the 2001 census, the village had a population of 1,324. Scissett is halfway between the villages of Clayton West, Skelmanthorpe and Denby Dale on the A636 road to Wakefield.

River Dearne runs through the village, which was affected by the 2007 United Kingdom floods.

Scissett grew up around the woollen industry in the 19th century as mill owners built houses in the area for their workers. The nearby coalfields also provided employment. These industries are now gone and some of the mills are now retail units.

The Scissett Baths (and leisure centre) is one of the main attractions for the surrounding area.

Scissett has first and middle schools to provide education for children ages 4 to 13.

Scissett Youth Band began life in the village in 1978 but moved to Shelley Methodist Hall in 1991.

Sport
Scissett is home to two sports clubs, Scissett Football Club and Nortonthorpe Cricket Club. Both play at Nortonthorpe sports club which was donated to the cricket club by the Norton family who owned the local mills at the time. When George Norton left the family home (Bagden Hall) to live in Nortonthorpe Hall he chose to outline a deed of trust, which specified that the seven and a half acres of land, which originally formed the cricket pitch, could only be used for the recreational purposes of the community. This is largely the reason behind the cricket club being called Nortonthorpe instead of Scissett.

Etymology
The etymology is doubtful, although some sources suggest it may be from Old English side "hillside, talus, slope" (related to Old Norse siða, of similar meaning), but nothing is confirmed. The first element is uncertain. However, another source claims a completely different etymology, that it was named after "Scissett Wood", itself named after a woman.

History

Sir Percy Richard Jackson, J.P., LL.D., died on 24 December 1941 at his home, The Woodlands, Scissett. He was a county councillor, from 1904 to 1937, and came to play an important role as chair of the West Yorkshire Local Education Authority (1917-1937). He was also a member of the consultative committee of the Board of Education, and of the Yorkshire Council for Further Education. Since 1918, he had been a member of the Court of Governors of Leeds University. He had been president of the Association of Education Committees and chairman of the education committee of the County Councils Association (for 6 years). Furthermore, as well as his role in Education, he played an important role in agriculture as the chairman of the Land Settlement Association. He was also chairman of the Yorkshire Council for Agricultural Education and a member of the Agricultural and Small Holdings Committee of the West Riding County Council. Moreover, he was a life member and vice-chairman of the Carnegie United Kingdom Trust. He was knighted in 1925.

Dr Colin Booth who was a mycologist and a leading authority on fusaria was born in Scissett, and educated at the village school.

See also
Listed buildings in Denby Dale

References

External links

Scissett Middle School website
Scissett Youth Band website
Scissett Football Club website
Scissett Baths & Fitness Centre website

News In A Nutshell

Villages in West Yorkshire
Denby Dale